Anaespogonius piceonigris is a species of beetle in the family Cerambycidae. It was described by Hayashi in 1972. It is known from Japan.

References

Desmiphorini
Beetles described in 1972